The following is an alphabetical list of articles related to Israel.

0–9
 1948 Palestine war

A
 Abortion in Israel
 Agricultural Labourers' Union
 Agriculture in Israel
 Aliyah
 Arab–Israeli conflict
 Archaeology of Israel
 Architecture of Israel

B
 Banking in Israel
 Basic Laws of Israel
 Ben Gurion Airport
 Biblical Zoo
 Biodiversity in Israel
 Borders of Israel

C
 Cabinet of Israel
 Channel 1 (Israel)
 Channel 2 (Israel)
 Chief Rabbinate of Israel
 Cinema of Israel
 Civil defense in Israel
 Conscription in Israel
 Crime in Israel
 Culture of Israel

D
 Dead Sea
 Demographics of Israel
 Districts of Israel

E
 Economy of Israel
 Education in Israel
 Elections in Israel
 Emblem of Israel

F
 Flag of Israel
 Foreign relations of Israel

G
 Geography of Israel

H
 Haifa
 Hatikvah
 Health care in Israel
 Hebrew language
 Hebrew University of Jerusalem
 History of Israel
 History of the Jews in Israel
 Human rights in Israel

I
 International rankings of Israel
 Internet in Israel
 Israel and apartheid
 Israel
Israel Defense Forces
Israel Hayom
Israel Police
Israeli Declaration of Independence
Israeli law
Israeli literature
Israeli new shekel
Israeli security forces
Israeli system of government
Israelis
Israel La'ad

J
 Jerusalem
 Jewish Agency for Israel
 Jews
 Jordan River
 Judaism

K
 Keren – Vocational Rehabilitation Centers in Israel
 Kibbutz
 Knesset

L
 Land of Israel
 Languages of Israel
 List of presidents of Israel
 List of prime ministers of Israel
 List of Israelis
 List of companies of Israel

M
 Maccabiah
 Masada
 Media of Israel
 Meyer Kaplan
 Mossad
 Music of Israel

N
 National parks and nature reserves of Israel
 National symbols of Israel
 Neviot

O
 Old City (Jerusalem)
 Oslo I Accord

P
 Persons Disabled in War against the Nazis Law
 Politics of Israel
 President of Israel
 Prime Minister of Israel

Q
 Quartet on the Middle East

R
 Religion in Israel

S
 Science and technology in Israel
 Sea of Galilee
 Six-Day War
 Sports in Israel

T
 Taxation in Israel
 Tel Aviv
 Telecommunications in Israel
 Television in Israel
 Temple Mount
 Teva Pharmaceutical Industries
 Time in Israel
 Tourism in Israel
 Transport in Israel
 Tzfat

U
 Uzi

V
 Visual arts in Israel

W
 Water Rights in Israel-Palestine
 Water supply and sanitation in Israel
 Western Wall
 Wildlife of Israel

X

Y
 Yad Vashem
 Years in Israel
 Yedioth Ahronoth
 Yom HaAliyah

Z
 Zionism

Lists
 List of companies of Israel
 List of endemic flora of Israel
 List of Israeli cities
 List of Israeli inventions and discoveries
 List of Israelis
 List of Israeli universities and colleges
 List of political parties in Israel
 List of reptiles of Israel

See also

 
 
 Outline of Israel
 Index of Jewish history-related articles
 Lists of country-related topics

External links
 

 
Israel